Raghib al-Nashashibi (1881–1951), CBE (hon), was a wealthy landowner and public figure during the Ottoman Empire, the British Mandate and the Jordanian administration. He was a member of the Nashashibi clan, one of the most influential families in Palestine, and mayor of Jerusalem from 1920 to 1934.

Background
Nashashibi graduated from Istanbul University and became Jerusalem's District Engineer. The Nashashibis  were one of the oldest and most influential Jerusalem families, and historical rivals of the Husayni family.

Political career

Nashashibi succeeded Musa Kazim al-Husayni as mayor of Jerusalem in 1920,  serving in 1927 with Haym Salomon and Jacob Faradj, who were elected as vice-mayors. He was a leading opponent of the Husayni family in Palestine. In 1937 he secretly favoured union with Transjordan. Nashashibi was a founding member of the Arab Higher Committee and a leader of the National Defence Party.

In August 1949 he was appointed head of the new Jordanian ministry for refugees and rehabilitation and was appointed first Governor-General for Arab Palestine in September of that same year. In 1950 he became Jordanian Minister of Agriculture and later Minister of Transport. He was also appointed as custodian of the Holy Places of Jerusalem with cabinet rank.

Personal life
His second wife, a French Jew, lived on Kantura street. Their eldest son was Mansur.

Bibliography
Sayigh, Yezid (2000). Armed Struggle and the Search for State: The Palestinian National Movement, 1949-1993. Oxford: Oxford University Press.

See also
Pro-Jerusalem Society (1918-1926) - Raghib al-Nashashibi, as city mayor, was a member of its leading Council

References

External links

 Prime Ministry of Jordan
 Facebook Nashshibi page
 Raghib al-Nashashibi page at the Institute for Palestine Studies 

1881 births
1951 deaths
Mayors of Jerusalem
Palestinian refugees
Arab people in Mandatory Palestine
Government ministers of Jordan
Refugees ministers of Jordan
State ministers of Jordan
Agriculture ministers of Jordan
Transport ministers of Jordan
Islamic affairs ministers of Jordan
Palestinian politicians
Istanbul University alumni
Turkish Army officers
Members of the Senate of Jordan
Arabs in Ottoman Palestine
Commanders of the Order of the British Empire
People of the 1936–1939 Arab revolt in Palestine